The Valea Roștilor is a right tributary of the river Danube in Romania. It discharges into the Danube near Ostrov.

References

Rivers of Tulcea County
Rivers of Romania